The Agra Independent School District is a school district based in Agra, Oklahoma (United States). It contains an elementary school, a middle school, and a high school.

See also
List of school districts in Oklahoma.

References

External links
 Agra Independent School District homepage
 

School districts in Oklahoma
Education in Lincoln County, Oklahoma